SAAG may refer to:
 Sagarika (born 1970), Indian Singer and actress, nicknames Saag.
 South Asia Analysis Group, a non-profit thinktank concerned with South Asian affairs.
 serum-ascites albumin gradient

See also 
 Saag, an Indian foodstuff